Silfiac is a commune in the Morbihan department of Brittany in north-western France. Inhabitants of Silfiac are called in French Silfiacois.

Geography

The village centre of Silfiac is the highest in the department of Morbihan. It is 270 meters above sea level. Silfiac is border by Séglien to the south, by Cléguérec and Sainte-Brigitte to the east, by Lescouët-Gouarec and Perret to the north and by Langoëlan to the west.

Map

Population

Prehistory

A six meters high standing stone called Quenouille du Diable (devil's distaff) rises in the town. It is one of the most imposing menhirs in Brittany.

thumb|center|Standing stone called Quenouille du Diable.

History

The Rohans and the Fravals were the main lords of the parish. Their coats of arms are visible on the south wall of the Saint-Laurent chapel. The Fraval owned the manor of Crenihuel, in Silfiac.

thumb|center|Coat of arms of Rohan and Fraval (Saint Laurent chapel).

See also
Communes of the Morbihan department
Gaston-Auguste Schweitzer Sculptor Silfiac war memorial

References

External links

 Mayors of Morbihan Association 

Communes of Morbihan